Present Company is the fifth studio album by singer-songwriter Janis Ian, and her solitary album for Capitol Records.

After her break-up with original producer Shadow Morton, and the failure of her final two Verve albums The Secret Life of J. Eddy Fink and Who Really Cares to dent the Billboard albums chart, Ian moved to California in 1970 and continued writing songs. In the autumn of 1970, Ian began working without a recording contract with producer and musician Jerry Corbitt (of The Youngbloods) in California before signing with Capitol Records in January. The sixteen songs, including three songwriting collaborations with Peter Cunningham, were released as Present Company early in 1971.

Despite a lengthy period of touring extending into early 1972, Present Company did not sell much better than its two predecessors, although it did "bubble under" the top 200. Janis' contract with Capitol was not renewed, and apart from the single "He's a Rainbow" being performed during the tour in support of her comeback album Stars, nothing from Present Company is known to have been played live since 1972, nor has the album ever been represented on any of Janis Ian's compilations.

Track listing

References

Janis Ian albums
1971 albums
Capitol Records albums